Limit Up is a 1989 comedy film starring Nancy Allen as Chicago commodities trader Casey Falls. The film was directed by Richard Martini and produced by Jonathan D. Krane. It was filmed through Chicago and prominently features scenes at the Chicago Board of Trade and Wrigley Field.

Rance Howard, Dean Stockwell, blues icon Ray Charles and Saturday Night Live alumni Danitra Vance and Brad Hall round out the cast. Additionally, actress Sally Kellerman makes a cameo appearance as a nightclub singer. John Tesh scored the film.

Plot
Casey Falls works as a runner at the Board of Trade for a ruthless commodities broker, Peter Oak. It is her ambition to someday become a top trader herself, but Oak condescendingly insists that Casey will never make the grade.

Upset at the lack of opportunities for women, Casey is visited by a spirit, Nike, who angelically gives her tips that result in Casey making millions of dollars for traders like Marty Callahan and Chuck Feeney. In love with her, Marty helps arrange it that Casey become a licensed trader. Before long, with Nike's can't-miss advice, Casey becomes one of the wealthiest women in the business.

However, her attitude changes when Nike abruptly goes from angel to devil and decides to coax Casey into monopolizing world markets and earning so much money that it will wreck the economy of others around the globe. Casey openly rebels, with the help of Marty and a street musician, Julius, who is not what he seems.

Cast
 Nancy Allen as Casey Falls
 Dean Stockwell as Peter Oak
 Brad Hall as Marty Callahan
 Danitra Vance as Nike
 Ray Charles as Julius
 Rance Howard as Chuck Feeney
 Sandra Bogan as Andy Lincoln
 William J. Wolf as Rusty
 Ava Fabian as Sasha
 Robbie Martini as Oak's Assistant
 Teressa Ovetta Burrell as Clerk
 Winifred Freedman as Pit Recorder
 Luana Anders as Teacher
 Richard Martini as Student
 Kellie Joy Beals as Reporter
 Nicky Blair as Maitre d'
 Force MDs as Band
 Sally Kellerman as Nightclub Singer

Critical response
The lighthearted romp received a B+ from Entertainment Weekly: "Splendid with good cast, good script, tidy direction" and "Nancy Allen is particularly delightful."[1] TV Guide noted that director Martini succeeds "in making the commodity-market scenes comprehensible for the layman." The St. Paul Pioneer Press said Limit Up "can't be faulted for enthusiasm or moxie" and its "strong equality-of-women-in-the-workplace message is welcome". Dually, The Chicago Tribune was less complimentary: "the picture is as spunky and good-natured as all get out, but in the absence of any original or substantial ideas, its spunk soon grates." In his Chicago Sun-Times review of Nov. 3, 1989, Roger Ebert described the film as "witless from one end to another" as well as "lame-brained and cornball".

External links
 
 
 
  Limit Up at Facebook

References

1989 films
1980s fantasy comedy films
1989 independent films
American fantasy comedy films
American independent films
1980s English-language films
Films set in Chicago
Films shot in Chicago
Trading films
Chicago in fiction
Works based on the Faust legend
1980s American films